Edwin Hill (25 November 1793 -  6 November 1876) was a Victorian postal official, the older brother of Rowland Hill, who invented a mechanical system to make envelopes and who campaigned for legal and political change.

Early life 
Hill was born in Birmingham, Warwickshire and educated at a school run by his father Thomas Wright Hill where he also taught when older. Later he worked at the Assay Office in Birmingham and then at a Birmingham brass-rolling mill where he became the manager.

In 1819 he married Anne Bucknall and they had ten children.

In 1827 he moved to Tottenham, London, where he managed a branch of the family school business while Rowland taught.

Stamp Office 
In 1840 Hill became the first British Controller of Stamps and he remained in that position until 1872.

Inventions 
Hill was an inveterate inventor of equipment to help the stamp department. He invented a mechanical system to make envelopes which was shown at the Great Exhibition of 1851, the patent for which was bought by Warren de la Rue to whom the machine was attributed. On his retirement a Treasury minute praised Hill's "...resourcefulness and considerable mechanical ability which had contributed so much to the success of the new postage scheme".

Campaigns 
Hill was one of the signatories to the notice calling a meeting on 22 January 1817 to petition for parliamentary reform and he campaigned for changes to the law relating to the handling of stolen property.

Death 
Hill died at home in London on 6 November 1876 and is buried at Highgate Cemetery.

References

Further reading 
Hill, W.E. An account of the Julian Hill family. London, 1938. (privately printed)
Edwin Hill's Diary 1840, edited by Roger Johnson and Frank L. Walton, Royal Philatelic Society London Archive No. 1, 2016.

External links

1793 births
1876 deaths
18th-century English people
19th-century English people
English inventors
People from Birmingham, West Midlands
Postal history
Committee members of the Society for the Diffusion of Useful Knowledge